Walter Francis Doran (born October 15, 1945) is a retired admiral in the United States Navy, who served as the Commander in Chief, United States Pacific Fleet (CINCPACFLT) from May 2002 to July 2005. He lives with his wife, Ginny and has two sons, one of whom has a daughter named Regan  He currently is Raytheon's president of Asia.

Navy career
A native of Albany, New York, Doran attended Villanova University where he earned a Bachelor of Arts Degree in history.  He was commissioned as an Ensign in 1967 through the Navy's Reserve Officer Training Corps (U.S. Navy) Program.  In 1979, Admiral Doran attended the Indian Defense Services Staff College in Wellington, India, where he earned a master's degree in Defense Studies. He describes this experience in India as "serendipitously important" as he attended the Staff College with men who would later come to serve in high-ranking positions within their respective governments, among them former Indian CNS Arun Prakash and his successor.  Admiral Doran also holds a master's degree in communications from the University of Oklahoma, which he received in 1983.

Selected to Flag rank in January, 1993, Doran served as Director, Operations, Plans and Political-Military (N-31/52) on the staff of the Chief of Naval Operations and as the Assistant to the Chairman, Joint Chiefs of Staff from September 2000 to May 2002.

Doran commanded the USS De Wert (FFG-45) and the USS Belknap (CG-26), flagship for the United States Sixth Fleet home ported in Gaeta, Italy. From June 1995 to December 1996, Admiral Doran served as commander of Amphibious Group One in and the Amphibious Force U.S. Seventh Fleet, both homeported out of Okinawa, Japan.  He also served as Deputy Commander in Chief and Chief of Staff, United States Southern Command from December 1996 through July 1998. From August 1998 to September 2000, Admiral Doran commanded United States Seventh Fleet homeported out of Yokosuka, Japan.

Significant shore assignments include tours on the staff of the Chief of Naval Operations in Washington, D.C., including Assistant Branch Head, Pacific Ocean Area/Pacific Plans and Policy Branch (OP-612C) and Branch Head, Europe/NATO Branch (OP-614). From June, 1983 to July, 1985, Doran was Military Assistant to the then Vice President of the United States George H. W. Bush.

Awards and decorations

Post-military career
In 2005, Doran was appointed to Navy Service Executive for Raytheon Company.  Since that time, he has become president of Raytheon Asia.  Doran has concentrated a significant portion of his Raytheon work in fostering and developing the company's sales to India.

In 2014, Doran was elected to the Military Officers Association of America board of directors.  That organization has approximately 350,000 members, made up of active duty, retired, and former commissioned officers and warrant officers who served in a uniformed services of the United States. 
In October 2018, Doran became chairman of the Military Officers Association's board of directors. He has also served on the Military Child Education Coalition board of directors and the U.S.-India Business Council board of directors.

References 

1945 births
Living people
Villanova University alumni
Military personnel from Albany, New York
University of Oklahoma alumni
United States Navy admirals
Recipients of the Legion of Merit
Recipients of the Navy Distinguished Service Medal
Recipients of the Defense Distinguished Service Medal